Laguna de Bay (Spanish for "Lagoon/Lake of Bay";), also known as Laguna Lake, is the largest lake in the Philippines. It is located southeast of Metro Manila, between the provinces of Laguna to the south and Rizal to the north. The lake is shaped like a crow's foot, with two peninsulas jutting out from the northern shore and filling the large volcanic Laguna Caldera. In the middle of the lake is the large island of Talim.

The lake is one of the primary sources of freshwater fish in the country. Its water drains to Manila Bay via the Pasig River. Environmental issues such as water quality problems created by population pressure and industrialization, invasive species and overfishing are of concern for the lake, hurting its economic importance to the country. As population expands in the Bay, its expected to rely more heavily on the lake for freshwater supply, thus water quality directly affects human populations.

Etymology 

Laguna de Bay means "Lagoon of [the town of] Bay" for the lakeshore town of Bay (pronounced Bä'ï), the former provincial capital of Laguna province. Alternate spellings of the town's name include "Bae" or "Ba-i", and in the early colonial times, "Bayi" or "Vahi". The town's name is believed to have come from the Tagalog word for "settlement" (bahayan), and is related to the words for "house" (bahay), "shore" (baybayin), and "boundary" (baybay), among others. The introduction of the English language during the American occupation of the Philippines, elicited confusion as the English word "bay", referring to another body of water, was mistakenly substituted to the town name that led to its mispronunciation. However, the word "Bay" in Laguna de Bay has always referred to the town.

The Spanish word laguna refers to not just lagoons but also for freshwater lakes, aside from lago. This would make the lake's alternate name, "Laguna Lake", tautological. However, the "Laguna" in "Laguna Lake" refers to the province of Laguna, the province at the southern shore of the lake, and not the lake itself. The province, though, was in turn named after the lake and was originally called La Laguna until the early 20th century.

In the pre-Hispanic era, the lake was known as "Puliran Kasumuran" (Laguna Copperplate Inscription,  900 AD), and later by "Pulilan" (Vocabulario de la lengua tagala, 1613. Pila, Laguna).

Currently, the lake is often incorrectly called "Laguna Bay," including in government websites, or "Laguna Lake", which is used by the Laguna Lake Development Authority.

Geography
It is considered to be the third largest inland body of water in Southeast Asia after Tonle Sap in Cambodia and Lake Toba in Sumatra, Indonesia. Laguna de Bay is bordered by the province of Laguna in the east, west and southwest, the province of Rizal in the north to northeast, and Metropolitan Manila in the northwest.

The middle part of Laguna de Bay between Mount Sembrano and Talim Island, is the Laguna Caldera believed to have been formed by two major volcanic eruptions, around 1 million and 27,000–29,000 years ago. Remnants of its volcanic history are shown by the presence of series of maars around the area of Tadlac Lake and Mayondon hill in Los Baños, Laguna, another maar at the southern end of Talim Island, and a solfataric field in Jala Jala.

Islands 
Known lake islands include Talim, the largest and most populated island on the lake; Calamba Island, which is completely occupied by the Wonder Island resort in Calamba, Laguna; Cielito Lindo, a privately owned island off the coast of mainland Cardona, Rizal; Malahi Island which used to be the site of Maligi Island military reservation, near the southern tip of Talim; the nearby islands of Bonga and Pihan, also in Cardona; and Bay Island off the coast of Bay, Laguna, which is closely associated with the precolonial crocodile-deity myths of that town.

Tributaries 
Among these are the Pagsanjan River which is the source of 35% of the Lake's water, the Santa Cruz River which is the source of 15% of the Lake's water, the Marikina River (through the Manggahan Floodway), the Mangangate River, the Tunasan River, the San Pedro River, the Cabuyao River, the San Cristobal River, the San Juan River, the Bay, Calo and Maitem rivers in Bay, the Molawin, Dampalit and Pele rivers in Los Baños, the Pangil River, the Tanay River, the Morong River, the Siniloan River and the Sapang Baho River.

The lake is primarily drained through the Pasig River, which is technically a tidal estuary instead of a unidirectional "river."

Uses

The lake is a multipurpose resource, used for fishery, transportation, irrigation of agricultural lands, power generation, and as a reservoir for regional flood management, among other things.

The lake has been used as a navigation lane for passenger boats since the Spanish colonial era. It is also used as a source of water for the Kalayaan Pumped-Storage Hydroelectric Project in Kalayaan, Laguna. Other uses include fishery, aquaculture, recreation, food support for the growing duck industry, irrigation and a "virtual" cistern for domestic, agricultural, and industrial effluents.

Environmental issues

Because of its importance in the development of the Laguna de Bay Region, unlike other lakes in the country, its water quality and general condition are closely monitored. This important water resource has been greatly affected by development pressures like population growth, rapid industrialization, and resources allocation.

Invasive species 
At least 18 fish species are known from Laguna de Bay; none are strictly endemic to the lake, but 3 are endemic to the Philippines: Gobiopterus lacustris, Leiopotherapon plumbeus and Zenarchopterus philippinus. Aquaculture is widespread in Laguna de Bay, but often involves non-native species. Some of these have escaped and have become invasive species, representing a threat to the native fish.

Pollution 
Government data showed that about 60% of the estimated 8.4 million people residing in the Laguna de Bay Region discharge their solid and liquid wastes indirectly to the lake through its tributaries. A large percentage of these wastes are mainly agricultural while the rest are either domestic or industrial According to DENR (1997), domestic and industrial wastes contribute almost equally at 30% each. Meanwhile, agricultural wastes take up the remaining 40%. In a recent sensitivity waste load model ran by the Laguna Lake Development Authority's (LLDA) Integrated Water Resources Management (IWRM) division, it revealed that 70% of biochemical oxygen demand (BOD) loadings came from households, 19% from industries, and 11% came from land run-off or erosion (LLDA, 2005).

As far as industries and factories are concerned, there are about 1,481 and increase is expected. Of the said figure, about 695 have wastewater treatment facilities. Despite this, the lake is absorbing huge amounts of pollution from these industries in the forms of discharges of industrial cooling water, toxic spills from barges and transport operations, and hazardous chemicals like lead, mercury, aluminum and cyanide. Based from the said figure, 65% are classified as “pollutive” industries.

The hastened agricultural modernization throughout the region took its toll on the lake. This paved the way for massive and intensified use of chemical based fertilizers and pesticides whose residues eventually find their way to the lake basin. These chemicals induce rapid algal growth in the area that depleted oxygen levels in the water. Hence, oxygen available to the lake is being used up thereby depleting the available oxygen for the fish, causing massive fish kills. A 2012 study found excessive pesticide use largely attributed to overapplication of pesticides close to the waterways.

As far as domestic wastes are concerned, around 10% of the 4,100 metric tons of waste generated by residents of Metro Manila are dumped into the lake, causing siltation of the lake. As reported by the now defunct Metropolitan Manila Waterworks and Sewerage System (MWSS), only 15% of the residents in the area have an effective waste disposal system. Moreover, around 85% of the families living along the shoreline do not have toilets and/or septic tanks.

Overfishing 
On January 29, 2008, the Mamamayan Para sa Pagpapanatili ng Pagpapaunlad ng Lawa ng Laguna (Mapagpala) accused the Laguna Lake Development Authority (LLDA) of the deterioration of Laguna de Bay due to multiplication of fish pens beyond the allowable limit.

Infrastructure

Manggahan floodway

Laguna Lakeshore Expressway Dike

Governance 

The main agency tasked to oversee the programs that aimed to develop and protect Laguna de Bay is the Laguna Lake Development Authority (LLDA), signed into law under Republic Act (RA) 4850 in 1966 during the Marcos administration. Originally only created as a quasi-government agency with regulatory and proprietary functions, its charter was strengthened by Presidential Decree (PD) 817 in 1975 and by Executive Order (EO) 927 in 1983 to include environmental protection and jurisdiction over the surface waters of the lake basin. In 1993, by virtue of the devolution, the administrative supervision of the LLDA was transferred to the DENR by EO 149.

Clean Water Act
The technical aspect regarding the quality of wastewater is given in DENR Administrative Order 1990–35. The order defines the critical water parameters’ value versus the classification of the body of water (e.g., lake or river). Discharge permits are issued by the LLDA only if the wastewater being discharged complied with the said order.

According to the Clean Water Act of 2004, the DENR (through the LLDA) shall implement a wastewater charge system in all management areas including the Laguna Lake region and Regional Industrial Centers through the collection of wastewater charges/fees. The system shall be established on the basis of payment to the government for discharging wastewater into the water bodies. Wastewater charges shall be established taking into consideration the following: a) to provide strong economic inducement for polluters to modify their production or management processes or to invest in pollution control technology in order to reduce the amount of water pollutants generated; b) to cover the cost of administering water quality management or improvement programs, including the cost of administering the discharge permitting and water pollution charge system; c) reflect damages caused by water pollution on the surrounding environment, including the cost of rehabilitation; d) type of pollutant; e) classification of the receiving water body; and f) other special attributes of the water body.

Integrated Coastal Ecosystem Conservation and Adaptive Management 
CECAM is a 5-year research cooperation between Japanese and Filipino scientists. Seven monitoring instruments are being used as part of the Continuous and Comprehensive Monitoring System (CCMS) provided by the Japanese government.

Cultural impact 
Laguna de Bay has had a significant impact on the cultures of the communities that grew up around its shores, ranging from folk medicine to architecture. For example, the traditional cure for a child constantly experiencing nose bleed in Victoria, Laguna is to have the child submerge his or her head in the lake water at daybreak. When nipa huts were more common, huts made in the lake area were constructed out of bamboo that would first be cured in the waters of Laguna de Bay.  Some experts on the evolution of local mythologies suggest that the legend of Mariang Makiling may have started out as that of the Lady (Ba'i) of Laguna de Bay, before the legend was transmuted to Mount Makiling.

See also

Laguna Lake Development Authority
Laguna Lakeshore Expressway Dike
Rehabilitation of the Pasig River

References

Sources
Laguna Lake Development Authority, LLDA (2009). "2009 Annual Report".
Laguna Lake Development Authority, LLDA (1995). "Laguna de Bay Master Plan – Final Report".

Further reading
Canonoy, F. V. (1997). Lake Laguna's environmental user fee system.
Laguna Lake Development Authority. "Frequently Asked Questions (archived 2007-06-08)".
McKitrick, R. (1999). A derivation of the marginal abatement cost curve. 
National Statistical Coordination Board (1996). Estimation of fish biomass in Laguna de Bay based on primary productivity.

External links

Laguna Lake Development Authority
Department of Environment and Natural Resources

 
Laguna de Bay
Landforms of Laguna (province)
Landforms of Metro Manila
Landforms of Rizal
Laguna de Bay
Calderas of the Philippines